The 27th Oregon Legislative Assembly had its regular session in 1913.

References 

Oregon legislative sessions
1913 in Oregon
1914 in Oregon
1913 U.S. legislative sessions
1914 U.S. legislative sessions